Day of Violence is a 1967 Italian western film directed by Al Bradley, written by Mario Amendola, Antonio Boccaci, Gian Luigi Buzzi and Paolo Lombardo, and starring Peter Lee Lawrence, Rosalba Neri, Andrea Bosic and Harold Bradley.

Cast

References

External links
 

1967 Western (genre) films
1967 films
Italian Western (genre) films
Films directed by Alfonso Brescia
Films with screenplays by Mario Amendola
Films scored by Bruno Nicolai
Plaion
1960s Italian films